Petridia is a genus of moths belonging to the family Tortricidae. It contains only one species, Petridia latypos, which is found on Sumatra.

See also
List of Tortricidae genera

References

External links
tortricidae.com

Archipini
Monotypic moth genera
Moths described in 1983
Moths of Asia
Tortricidae genera